Spartakiad of Peoples of the USSR (Spartakiada narodov SSSR) were mass multi-event competitions in the Soviet Union in 1956–1991, descendants of the 1928 All-Union Spartakiad that took place in Moscow. The competitions were conducted between constituent republics of the Soviet Union, with the summer editions always held in Moscow and winter editions held four times in Sverdlovsk, twice in Krasnoyarsk and once in Kiev. There were ten summer Spartakiads and seven winter Spartakiads.

Background
In 1952, the Soviet Union decided to join the Olympic movement, and international Spartakiads ceased. However, the term continued to exist for internal sports events in the Soviet Union of different levels, from local up to the Spartakiad of the Peoples of the USSR. The latter event was held twice in four years: Winter Spartakiad and Summer Spartakiad.

The first Soviet Spartakiad was held in 1956. Until 1975, all summer finals were held in Moscow, later in some other cities throughout the Soviet Union (though most events were still held in Moscow). The winter finals were often held in Sverdlovsk.

List of Spartakiades of Peoples of USSR
 Summer (1956, 1959, 1963, 1967, 1971, 1975, 1979, 1983, 1986, 1991)
 Winter (1962, 1966, 1974, 1978, 1982, 1986, 1990)

Summer

Winter

Sports

Summer

References

External links
 Spartakiads at RSSSF
 Spartakiad in the Soviet Union
 Spartakiad of Peoples of the USSR in 1956 and 1959.
 Kostenko, A. Summer spartakiads of peoples of the USSR. Blogs at sovsport.ru. 2011
 Spartakiads of Peoples of the USSR. Dynamo Encyclopedia at Google Books. "OLMA Media Group", 2003. 

 
Multi-sport events in the Soviet Union
Soviet Union
1956 establishments in the Soviet Union
Recurring sporting events established in 1956
Recurring sporting events disestablished in 1991
1991 disestablishments in the Soviet Union